Les Agnettes is a station on Line 13 of the Paris Métro. In the future, it will also be served by Paris Metro Line 15. It is situated on the line's northwestern branch, under Rue Robert Dupont and the Rue des Bas, on the border of the communes of Gennevilliers and Asnières-sur-Seine in Hauts-de-Seine.

Location
The station is located at the crossroads of the D11 and D19 roads in the Hauts-de-Seine.

History
The station opened on 14 June 2008 with the completion of the extension of Line 13 from Gabriel Péri to Les Courtilles. It is named after the neighbourhood street, the Rue des Agnettes. In 2013, it was used by 2,368,284 passengers, making it the 228th busiest Métro station out of 302. In 2019, 2,309,419 travelers entered this station, making it the 225th busiest Métro station out of 302.

Passenger services

Station layout

Platform
Les Agnettes is a standard configuration station with two platforms separated by metro tracks.

Bus connections
The station is served by lines 178, 238 and 366 of the RATP Bus Network and, at night, by line N51 of the Noctilien bus network.

Future
The station could eventually (2030) offer a connection with the Grand Paris Express network. The Périphériques company is responsible for designing and building this new station. The platforms will be at a depth of 27 meters. Preparatory work began in July 2017. In this context, the buildings at 11-21 Rue des Agnettes, located at the site of the future Line 15 station, will be demolished. Construction of the station was to began after January 2019.

Gallery

See also
 List of stations of the Paris Métro

References

Paris Métro stations in Asnières-sur-Seine
Paris Métro stations in Gennevilliers
Railway stations in France opened in 2008